Silić is a surname found in Bosnia and Herzegovina and Croatia. It may refer to:

Bruno Silić (1958–2004), Croatian water polo coach
Mateo Silić (born 1984), Croatian footballer
Ljubo Silić, bassist in Laufer (band)

Families

Serbian
The surname has been recorded in Kosovo, Užice, and Belgrade.

During the Ottoman period, there was a hajduk buljubaša named Silić active in Herzegovina. The surname was mentioned in 1696, when a Toma Silić was recorded. In the 19th century, a Pavle Silić was active as a painter in Belgrade. Ratomir Silić, a Partisan fighter from Užice, was captured by the Chetniks.

Croatian
In Croatia, there are over 200 people with the surname. There are families with the surname in the surroundings of Split, where water polo coach Bruno and footballer Mateo were born. The nearby village of Dicmo houses a Silić family.

A Silić family settled southern Dalmatia from Trebinje in 1730; the first to settle was Miće Silić, the son of Nikola; their slava is St. Martin (1968).

Bosnian
In Mostar, Bosnia and Herzegovina, there were 3 households of a Silić family recorded in 1925.
The surname has been recorded in Montenegro.

A Silić family settled in Janun near Nablus in Palestine, along with other Yugoslav families.

See also
Siliqi, Albanian surname
Vasilić, Serbian surname

References

Croatian surnames
Serbian surnames